This is a list of English football transfers for the 2016 summer transfer window. Only moves featuring at least one Premier League or Championship club are listed.

The summer transfer window began once clubs had concluded their final domestic fixture of the 2015–16 season, but many transfers will only officially go through on 1 July because the majority of player contracts finish on 30 June. The window will remain open until 18:00 BST on 1 September 2016. The window shuts at 18:00 BST this time due to the UEFA player registration deadlines for both the Champions League and Europa League ending at 23:00 BST, giving the 6 sides still in Europe time to conclude deals and register their player for continental matches if appropriate.

This list also includes transfers featuring at least one Premier League or Championship club which were completed after the end of the winter 2015–16 transfer window and before the end of the 2016 summer window.

Players without a club may join at any time, and clubs below Premier League level may sign players on loan during loan windows. Clubs may be permitted to sign a goalkeeper on an emergency loan if they have no registered goalkeeper available.

Transfers

All clubs without a flag are English. Note that while Cardiff City and Swansea City are affiliated with the Football Association of Wales and thus take the Welsh flag, they play in the English football league system, and so their transfers are included here.

 The deal was completed in May 2016.
 Player officially joined his club on 1 July 2016.
 Player officially joined his club on 4 July 2016.
 Part of a combined deal worth £5.5m.

References

Specific

Transfers Summer 2016
Summer 2016
English